The following table indicates the party of elected officials in the U.S. state of Utah:
Governor
Secretary of State/Lieutenant Governor
Attorney General
State Treasurer
State Auditor

The table also indicates the historical party composition in the:
State Senate
State House of Representatives
State delegation to the U.S. Senate
State delegation to the U.S. House of Representatives

For years in which a presidential election was held, the table indicates which party's nominees received the state's electoral votes.

References

See also 
Politics of Utah

Politics of Utah
Government of Utah
Utah